Raphael Augusto Santos da Silva (born 6 March 1991) is a Brazilian professional footballer who plays as a midfielder for Bangladesh Premier League club Abahani Limited Dhaka. He is known for doing beautiful skills with the ball and is an elegant midfielder. He was popular in the Indian super league playing for the 2 Southern teams Chennaiyan FC and Bengaluru FC and winning a title with Chennaiyan.

Club career
Born in Rio de Janeiro, Augusto graduated from the youth academy of Fluminense and made his senior debut in the Série A season. After playing for Duque de Caxias and América-RN in his country on loan, he joined Major League Soccer club D.C. United on loan on 28 July 2012. On 11 November, he made his debut, coming on as a substitute for the injured Marcelo Saragosa in a 3–1 defeat against Houston Dynamo. On 14 June 2013, he returned to his parent club after his contract was terminated by mutual consent. Seven days later, he joined Polish club Legia Warsaw on a loan deal. On 14 May 2014, manager Henning Berg announced that Augusto would return to Flu in summer.

After loan stints with Bangu and Madureira in 2015, Augusto was loaned out to Indian Super League club Chennaiyin FC on 11 August 2015. On 18 November, he scored his first goal for the club in a 2–1 defeat against ATK. Although his club went on to win the league, he missed the final due to an injury. On 17 July 2016, he signed permanently with the club. He went on to play all the matches for the club during the season.

On 31 January 2017, Augusto was reloaned to Brazilian club Bangu. On 20 July, he signed a two-year contract extension. He played 18 times during the 2017–18 season, scoring three goals and adding one assist, with his side winning the league.

On 24 August 2019, Augusto signed for Bengaluru FC on a two-year deal, that keeps him with the Blues till the end of the 2020–21 season.

On 30 November 2020, Augusto signed for Dhaka Abahani in Bangladesh Football Premier League.

Honours
Chennaiyin
 Indian Super League: 2015 
 Indian Super League: 2017–18 

Abahani Limited Dhaka
 Independence Cup: 2021–22
 Federation Cup: 2021–22

References

External links 

1991 births
Living people
Footballers from Rio de Janeiro (city)
Brazilian footballers
Bengaluru FC players
Brazilian expatriate footballers
Brazil youth international footballers
Major League Soccer players
Ekstraklasa players
Fluminense FC players
Duque de Caxias Futebol Clube players
América Futebol Clube (RN) players
D.C. United players
Legia Warsaw players
Indian Super League players
Chennaiyin FC players
Abahani Limited (Dhaka) players
Bangladesh Football Premier League players
Expatriate soccer players in the United States
Expatriate footballers in Poland
Expatriate footballers in India
Association football midfielders